The fourth season of the American television comedy The Office premiered in the United States on NBC on September 27, 2007, and concluded on May 15, 2008. The season consisted of 9 half-hour episodes, and 5 hour-long episodes to comprise the 19 total episodes of material created. The Office is an American adaptation of the British TV series of the same name, and is presented in a mockumentary format, portraying the daily lives of office employees in the Scranton, Pennsylvania branch of the fictitious Dunder Mifflin Paper Company. The season was originally set to include 30 episodes, but due to the 2007–2008 Writers Guild of America strike, production was called to a halt, in result, the season was shortened to 19 episodes. It stars Steve Carell, Rainn Wilson, John Krasinski, Jenna Fischer, and B. J. Novak, with supporting performances from Melora Hardin, Ed Helms, Leslie David Baker, Brian Baumgartner, Creed Bratton, Kate Flannery, Mindy Kaling, Angela Kinsey, Paul Lieberstein, Oscar Nunez, Craig Robinson, and Phyllis Smith.

This season marked the departure of Karen Filippelli (Rashida Jones) as a regular character, although she appeared for a few seconds in the first episode, "Fun Run" and in the tenth episode, "Branch Wars", as the regional manager of the Utica branch. Relationships again emerged as the main theme of the season, with Jim Halpert (John Krasinski) and Pam Beesly's (Jenna Fischer) rising, and Michael Scott (Steve Carell) and Jan Levinson's (Melora Hardin), as well as Dwight Schrute (Rainn Wilson) and Angela Martin's (Angela Kinsey) declining. Technology was another prevalent theme as the office staff struggled with initiatives introduced by Ryan Howard (B. J. Novak) to modernize the company.

The fourth season of The Office aired on Thursdays at 9:00 p.m. (Eastern) in the United States. The season marked a slight drop in ratings compared to the previous two seasons. Critical reception to the season continued to be largely positive. The season was released on DVD by Universal Studios Home Entertainment in a four-disc box set in the Region 1 area on September 2, 2008. The DVD set contains all 19 episodes, as well as commentaries from creators, writers, actors, and directors on some of the episodes. It also contains deleted scenes from all of the episodes, as well as bloopers and other promos.

Production
The fourth season of the show was produced by Reveille Productions and Deedle-Dee Productions, both in association with Universal Media Studios. The show is based upon the British series created by Ricky Gervais and Stephen Merchant, both of whom are executive producers on both the US and UK versions. The Office is produced by Greg Daniels, who is also an executive producer and the show runner. All the writers from the previous season returned, with the writing staff consisting of Daniels, Michael Schur, Lester Lewis, Mindy Kaling, B. J. Novak, Paul Lieberstein, Lee Eisenberg, Gene Stupnitsky, Jennifer Celotta, Brent Forrester, and Justin Spitzer. Schur, Lieberstein and Celotta were co-executive producers; Kaling, Eisenberg and Stupnitsky were producers; Novak and Lewis were supervising producers; and Forrester was a consulting producer.

This season featured 19 half-hour segments which were combined and aired to produce 14 distinct episodes, directed by 11 directors. Greg Daniels, Craig Zisk, Ken Whittingham, Paul Lieberstein, Jason Reitman, Joss Whedon, Paul Feig, Julian Farino, Jeffrey Blitz, Randall Einhorn, and Tucker Gates each directed episodes during the season, with Feig and Whittingham directing multiple episodes. Although The Office was mainly filmed on a studio set at Valley Center Studios in Van Nuys, California, the city of Scranton, Pennsylvania, where the show is set, was also used for shots of the opening theme.

Originally, NBC ordered a full season of 30 episodes. After 12 episodes were filmed, production was suspended due to the effects of the 2007–2008 Writers Guild of America strike. The Writers Guild of America (WGA) went on strike at 12:01 a.m. Eastern Standard Time on November 5, 2007. Filming of The Office immediately halted on that date, as Steve Carell, who is a member of the WGA, refused to cross WGA picket lines. Members of Writers Guild of America, East and Writers Guild of America, West voted to end the 100-day strike on February 12, 2008, and writers were allowed to return to work on the same day. The WGA allowed for show runners to return to work on February 11, in preparation for the conclusion of the strike. The show runner for The Office, Greg Daniels, returned on February 11, and the show's writers returned to work on February 13. The duration of the strike resulted in a script of a Christmas-themed episode being discarded, as production of the episode was due to start the week that the strike began. The basic premise of the Christmas episode, which revolved around the German folk character Belsnickel, was later purposely recycled and reused in the ninth season entry "Dwight Christmas".

Season overview 
Notable ongoing subplots that affect the fourth season and beyond include:

 Jim Halpert and Pam Beesly starting their romantic relationship
 Ryan Howard's promotion to a corporate position
 Michael Scott's deteriorating relationship with Jan Levinson and his subsequent search for a new love interest
 Dwight Schrute's breakup with Angela Martin after he euthanizes one of her cats
 Andy Bernard's pursuing of Angela, unaware of her lingering feelings for Dwight
 Toby Flenderson's moving to Costa Rica, leading to the arrival of new HR rep Holly Flax

Cast

Many characters portrayed by The Office cast are based on the British version of the show. While these characters normally have the same attitude and perceptions as their British counterparts, the roles have been redesigned to better fit the American show. The show is known for its generally large cast size, with many of its actors and actresses known particularly for their improvisational work.

Main
 Steve Carell as Michael Scott, Regional Manager of the Dunder Mifflin Scranton Branch. Loosely based on David Brent, Gervais' character in the British version, Scott is a dim-witted and lonely man, who attempts to win friends as the office comedian, usually making himself look bad in the process. 
 Rainn Wilson as Dwight Schrute, who, based upon Gareth Keenan, is the office's top-performing sales representative. 
 John Krasinski as Jim Halpert, a sales representative, assistant manager, and prankster, who is based upon Tim Canterbury, and is in love with Pam, the receptionist. 
 Jenna Fischer as Pam Beesly, who is based on Dawn Tinsley, is shy, but in many cases a cohort with Jim in his pranks on Dwight. 
 B. J. Novak as Ryan Howard, who for the first two seasons is a temporary worker, but is promoted to sales representative in the third season and later ascends to the position of Vice President, North East Region and Director of New Media.

Starring
 Melora Hardin as Jan Levinson, a former Dunder Mifflin employee and Michael's girlfriend.
 Ed Helms as Andy Bernard, a preppy salesman with anger issues.
 Leslie David Baker as Stanley Hudson, a grumpy salesman.
 Brian Baumgartner as Kevin Malone, a dim-witted accountant, based on Keith Bishop.
 Creed Bratton as Creed Bratton, the office’s strange quality assurance officer.
 Kate Flannery as Meredith Palmer, the promiscuous supplier relations representative.
 Mindy Kaling as Kelly Kapoor, the pop-culture obsessed customer service representative.
 Angela Kinsey as Angela Martin, a judgemental accountant and Dwight’s main love interest.
 Paul Lieberstein as Toby Flenderson, the sad-eyed human resources representative.
 Oscar Nunez as Oscar Martinez, an intelligent accountant, who is also gay.
 Craig Robinson as Darryl Philbin, the warehouse supervisor.
 Phyllis Smith as Phyllis Vance, a motherly saleswoman.

Recurring
 Andy Buckley as David Wallace, Dunder Mifflin’s CFO.
 Bobby Ray Shafer as Bob Vance, Phyllis’ husband, who runs Vance Refrigeration.
 Hugh Dane as Hank Tate, the building’s security guard.

Notable guests
 Rashida Jones as Karen Filippelli, Jim’s ex-girlfriend, who is now regional manager of the Utica branch.
 Amy Ryan as Holly Flax, Toby’s replacement in human resources.

Reception

Ratings
The fourth-season premiere "Fun Run" received a 5.1/12 share in the Nielsen ratings among viewers aged 18 to 49, meaning that 5.1% of viewers aged 18 to 49 watched the episode, and 12% of viewers watching television at the time watched the episode. "Fun Run" attracted 9.7 million viewers overall. Both of these figures built upon the marks set by the third-season finale "The Job". In the weeks following "Fun Run", The Office never received more than nine million viewers. After the Writers Strike, The Office once again eclipsed the nine million viewers mark, when the episode "Dinner Party" received 9.3 million viewers. The episode "Chair Model", the second episode to be released after the end of the strike garnered 9.9 million viewers, a high for the fourth season. While the episode "Job Fair" received the lowest number of viewers for the season, at 7.2 million, it and the episode following it, the season finale "Goodbye Toby", both scored the highest viewer percentage increase among digital video recording users for their respective weeks.

The season ranked as the seventy-seventh most watched television series during the 2007–2008 season, with an average of 8.04 million viewers; this marked a decrease in ranking and viewership from the previous season, which had ranked as the sixty-eighth most-watched series.

Critical review

The fourth season received critical acclaim. Travis Fickett, a reviewer from IGN, praised both the writing and the acting of season 4. When speaking of the season finale "Goodbye Toby", Fickett went on to say "It's a great episode that ends a great season. There are more than a few questions raised that will have us eagerly tuning in when the show returns in the fall." Aubry D'Arminio praised the season, but she also showed disapproval at what she felt was a lack of use for some of The Office'''s supporting cast in the episodes directly following the Writers' Strike, saying "I just feel a bit sad that, minus Leslie David Baker's Stanley, these excellent actors/characters haven't been highlighted nearly enough since the series' return in April." In a comprehensive review of the fourth season DVD, IGN reviewers Travis Fickett and Phil Pirrello both believed "this season to be one of the show's best, [but felt] that 14 episodes across four discs gives way to crowding, especially when the season tries to tackle Jim and Pam dating, Angela and Dwight breaking up, Andy and Angela dating by way of awkward silence, Michael and Jan breaking up, Toby leaving the office and a new love interest for Michael joining the cast." Fickett and Pirrello gave the season a total score of 8 out of 10.

HonorsThe Office'' received eight nominations at the 60th Primetime Emmy Awards. The show's producers received a nomination for "Outstanding Comedy Series", while Paul Lieberstein and Paul Feig both received nominations for "Outstanding Directing for a Comedy Series", for the episodes "Money" and "Goodbye, Toby", respectively. For his portrayal of Michael Scott, Carell received a nomination for "Outstanding Lead Actor in a Comedy Series", and for his portrayal of Dwight Schrute, Wilson received a nomination for "Outstanding Supporting Actor in a Comedy Series". Dean Holland and Dave Rogers both received a nomination for "Outstanding Picture Editing For A Comedy Series (Single Or Multi-camera)" for their work on "Goodbye, Toby", while Ben Patrick, John W. Cook III, and Peter J. Nusbaum were all nominated in the "Outstanding Sound Mixing For A Comedy Or Drama Series (half-hour) And Animation" category for their work on the episode "Local Ad". For the episode "Dinner Party", the creative writing team of Gene Stupnitsky and Lee Eisenberg received a nomination for "Outstanding Writing for a Comedy Series".

Episodes

In the following table, "U.S. viewers (million)" refers to the number of Americans who viewed the episode on the night of broadcast. Episodes are listed by the order in which they aired, and may not necessarily correspond to their production codes.

 denotes an hour-long episode (with advertisements; actual runtime around 42 minutes).

Home media

References

External links
 
 

 
2007 American television seasons
2008 American television seasons